Katia Tarasconi (born 5 October 1973) is an Italian politician, Mayor of Piacenza since 2022.

Biography 
Tarasconi graduated in 1998 with a degree in graphic arts from University of Miami where she worked for two years for the editorial art department of the Miami Herald. Back to Italy, she worked as commercial manager of the communication company Irix from Piacenza, of which she was managing director from 2001 to 2008.

Assessor and Councilor 
She joined the Democratic Party and has been assessor for trade in Piacenza from 2007 to 2015 with the Mayor Roberto Reggi (PD) until 2012 and with the Mayor Paolo Dosi (PD) since 2012. In the 2014 Emilia-Romagna regional election, she became the first of the non-elected in the Piacenza district, but after Paola Gazzolo's nomination as Regional assessor (according to the Italian law, a role in the Regional executive is not compatible with the legislative seat) Tarasconi was proclaimed on 27 July 2015 in the former seat of her predecessor Gazzolo in the Legislative Assembly of Emilia-Romagna, being later re-elected at the 2020 regional election.

Mayor of Piacenza 
On the occasion of the 2022 local elections, she announced her candidacy for the office of Mayor of Piacenza as official candidate of the centre-left coalition (Democratic Party, Azione and four civic lists). After obtaining 39.93% in the first round, she enters the ballot against the centre-right candidate and outgoing mayor Patrizia Barbieri and is elected new mayor with 53,46% of the votes. She left her seat in the Regional council on 28 June - according to the Italian law, the office of Mayor is not compatible with membership of the National Parliament or Regional Council - and she officially took office as new Mayor of Piacenza on 29 June.

Personal life 
Divorced, already married to an American citizen, she had two children: in September 2021, she lost her 18-year-old son Kristopher Dixon, involved in a car accident in Rome.

References 

Living people
1973 births
21st-century Italian politicians
University of Miami alumni
Mayors of places in Emilia-Romagna
People from Piacenza
Women mayors of places in Italy
Democratic Party (Italy) politicians
21st-century Italian women